Triebendorf is a former municipality in the district of Murau in the Austrian state of Styria. Since the 2015 Styria municipal structural reform, it is part of the municipality Murau.

Geography
Triebendorf lies about 6 km east of Murau.

References

Cities and towns in Murau District